Rural communities (Communautés rurales) (CR) are the fourth-level administrative divisions in Senegal. They are administrative subdivisions comprising the villages, but are distinct from the urban communes and municipalities concerning medium or large towns.

Senegal is a predominantly agricultural country, and the rural communities by far encompass the largest part of the national territory.

Law
The rural communities were imposed by the law No. 72.25 on 19 April 1972.

Until early 2008, there were about 324 rural communities but in August 2008 the number has increased and there are now about 340.

Dakar Region
Bambylor
Tivaouane Peulh-Niaga
Yène

Diourbel Region

Bambey Department
Baba Garage
Dinguiraye
Keur Samba Kane
Gawane
Lambaye
Ngogom
Réfane
Dangalma
Ndondol
Ngoye
Thiakar

Diourbel Department
Dankh Sène
Gade Escale
Keur Ngalgou
Ndindy
Taiba Moutoupha
Ndoulo
Ngohé
Patar
Tocky-Gare
Touré Mbonde

Mbacke Department
Darou Salam Typ
Dendey Gouyegui
Madina
Ndioumane Taiba
Thiékène
Touba Mboul
Ngabou Dalla
Missirah
Nghoye
Touba Fall
Touba Mosquée
Sadio
Taïf

Fatick Region

Fatick Department
Diakhao
Mbéllacadio
Ndiob
Djilasse
Fimela
Loul Séssène
Palmarin
Ngayokhème
Niakhar
Patar
Diarrère
Diouroup
Tattaguine
Foundiougne
Passy
Sokone
Diossong

Foundiougne Department
Djilor
Bassoul
Dionewar
Djirnda
Keur Saloum Diané
Keur Samba Guèye
Nioro Allassane Tall
Toubacouta
Gossas Gossas
Guinguinéo

Gossas Department
Colobane
Mbar
Gagnick
Ndiago
Mbadakhoune
Ngathe Naoudé
Ourour
Ndiéné Lagane
Ouadiour
Patar Lia

Kaolack Region

Kaffrine Department
Birkelane
Mabo, Senegal
Mboss
Ndiognick
Gainte Pathé
Ida Mouride
Lour Escale
Maka-Yop
Ribot Escale
Saly Escale
Boulel
Darou Minam 2
Djanké Souf
Gniby
Kahi, Senegal
Malem Hodar
Ndioum Ngainthe
Diokoul Mbelbouck
Kathiotte
Médinatoul Salam II
Nganda

Kaolack Department

Guinguinéo Department

Kaolack Department

Koungheul Department

Nioro du Rip Department

Kolda Region

Kolda Department

Médina Yoro Foulah Department

Vélingara Department

Louga Region

Kébémer Department

Linguère Department

Louga Department

Matam Region

Kanel Department

Matam Department

Ranérou Ferlo Department

Saint-Louis Region

Dagana Department

Podor Department

Saint-Louis Department

Tambacounda Region

Bakel Department

Kédougou Department

Koumpentoum Department

Tambacounda Department

Thiès Region

M'bour Department

Thiès Department
Séssène
Yaboyabo

Tivaouane Department

Ziguinchor Region

Bignona Department

Oussouye Department
Diembéring

Ziguinchor Department

References
Senegalaisement.com